Foreign Legion is the third studio album by Murfreesboro, TN band Fluid Ounces.

The album marked a turning point for Fluid Ounces. The band had separated from Spongebath Records, and both founding members Brian Rogers and Ben Morton had left in 1999 to pursue other interests. (The album was in fact named in honor of Morton, who at the time was considering joining the elite French Foreign Legion.) However, while Rogers and Morton both contributed guitar and bass to several tracks respectively, the album also featured Doug Payne on guitar, Jason Dietz on bass, and Justin Meyer on drums.

The album was recorded at County Q Studios in Nashville, Tennessee and was engineered by Chuck Pfaff.

Although Foreign Legion finally received a proper release by Japanese label Cutting Edge in March 2002, the album sadly shared a similar fate as Big Notebook for Easy Piano and In the New Old-Fashioned Way, receiving only minimal distribution and promotion domestically.

While the album has received some criticism for its slicker, polished sound, Foreign Legion continued to widen the band's fanbase and featured the trademark Fluid Ounces variety of eclectic musical styles, ranging from playful boogie-woogie ("Poet Tree") and lush balladry ("The Last Thing") to hints of Latin ("Encyclopedia Brown") and psychedelia ("Stark Raving Mad").

Track listing

     Show On The Road (4:30)
     Poet Tree (2:24)
     Metaphor (3:47)
     Expect the Worst (4:14)
     Sugar Mama (4:46)	
     The Last Thing (5:18)
     Smitten (3:36)
     Encyclopedia Brown (2:17)	
     So far, So Good (4:32)
    Stark Raving Mad (5:31)
    She Blinded Me with Science (3:45) [Thomas Dolby cover]
    Thinking Cap (Demo) (3:09)	
    Invincible Boy (Demo) (2:44)
    City Lights (Demo) (3:13)

Credits
Seth Timbs (piano, vocals, songwriter)
Brian Rogers (guitar, vocals)
Ben Morton (bass)
Justin Meyer (drums)
Doug Payne (guitar)
Jason Dietz (bass)
Chuck Pfaff (engineer)

References

Fluid Ounces albums
2002 albums